The TW postcode area, also known as the Twickenham postcode area, is a group of twenty postcode districts in south-east England, within thirteen post towns. These cover parts of south-west London and north-west Surrey, plus a very small part of Berkshire.

Mail for this area is sorted at the Jubilee Mail Centre, Hounslow, and the area served includes most of the London Boroughs of Richmond upon Thames and Hounslow, the southernmost part of the London Borough of Hillingdon (including Heathrow Airport) and very small parts of the Royal Borough of Kingston upon Thames. In Surrey it covers virtually all of the borough of Spelthorne, the northern part of the borough of Runnymede and very small parts of the borough of Elmbridge, and in Berkshire it covers the village of Wraysbury in the Royal Borough of Windsor and Maidenhead.



Coverage
The coverage of the postcode districts, naming all localities :

|-
! TW1
| TWICKENHAM
| Twickenham, St. Margarets, Strawberry Hill (east)
| Richmond upon Thames, Hounslow
|-
! TW2
| TWICKENHAM
| Twickenham (west), Whitton, Strawberry Hill (west), Fulwell (north)
| Richmond upon Thames
|-
! TW3
| HOUNSLOW
| Hounslow, Lampton, Whitton (north)
| Hounslow, Richmond upon Thames
|-
! TW4
| HOUNSLOW
| Hounslow West, Hounslow Heath, Whitton (west), Cranford (south)
| Hounslow, Richmond upon Thames
|-
! TW5
| HOUNSLOW
| Heston, Cranford (north), Osterley (west)
| Hounslow
|-
! TW6
| HOUNSLOW
| Heathrow Airport
| Hillingdon
|-
! TW7
| ISLEWORTH
| Isleworth, Osterley (east and centre), Whitton (north-east)
| Hounslow, Richmond upon Thames
|-
! TW8
| BRENTFORD
| Brentford, Kew Bridge, Syon Park, Brentford Ait
| Hounslow, Richmond upon Thames
|-
! TW9
| RICHMOND
| Richmond, Kew, North Sheen (north)
| Richmond upon Thames
|-
! TW10
| RICHMOND
| Ham, Petersham, Richmond Hill, North Sheen (south), Richmond Park
| Richmond upon Thames, Kingston upon Thames
|-
! TW11
| TEDDINGTON
| Teddington, Fulwell (east), Bushy Park
| Richmond upon Thames
|-
! TW12
| HAMPTON
| Hampton, Hampton Hill, Fulwell (west)
| Richmond upon Thames
|-
! TW13
| FELTHAM
| Feltham (south of the railway line), Hanworth
| Hounslow, Richmond upon Thames
|-
! TW14
| FELTHAM
| Feltham (north of the railway line), North Feltham, East Bedfont, Hatton 
| Hounslow, Hillingdon, Spelthorne
|-
! TW15
| ASHFORD
| Ashford
| Spelthorne, Hounslow
|-
! TW16
| SUNBURY-ON-THAMES
| Sunbury-on-Thames
| Spelthorne, Elmbridge, Richmond upon Thames
|-
! TW17
| SHEPPERTON
| Shepperton, Upper Halliford, Charlton, Littleton
| Spelthorne, Elmbridge
|-
! TW18
| STAINES-UPON-THAMES
| Staines-upon-Thames, Egham Hythe, Laleham
| Spelthorne, Runnymede, Windsor and Maidenhead
|-
! TW19
| STAINES-UPON-THAMES
| Stanwell, Stanwell Moor, Wraysbury, Sunnymeads, Hythe End
| Spelthorne, Windsor and Maidenhead, Hillingdon
|-
! TW20
| EGHAM
| Egham, Englefield Green, Thorpe
| Runnymede
|}

Map

See also
Postcode Address File
List of postcode areas in the United Kingdom

Notes and references
Notes 

References
 
Google Maps

External links
Royal Mail's Postcode Address File
A quick introduction to Royal Mail's Postcode Address File (PAF)

Postcode areas covering London
Postcode areas covering South East England
Media and communications in the London Borough of Richmond upon Thames
Media and communications in the London Borough of Hounslow
Media and communications in the London Borough of Hillingdon
Borough of Spelthorne